Dundee East may mean or refer to:

 Dundee East (UK Parliament constituency)
 Dundee East (Scottish Parliament constituency)